Max Timisela (6 July 1944 in Bandung, Jawa Barat) is a retired Indonesian footballer who played as a forward. He won with Persib Bandung the Perserikatan in 1962 and played for Indonesia in 1963–1970.

Early career
Timisela's early career started at Cimahi. In the 1950s, when he was at Junior High School, he signed into UNI Bandung following his brothers. From there, the chance to sign into Persib opened.

Finally, Timisela started to play for Persib in 1962. As other young players, started into the bench.  After three years, he made it into Persib's starting eleven.

International career
His was called up for Indonesia in 1963. In 1965,  Timisela toured Europe with the PSSI team, playing against the Netherlands, West Germany, Bulgaria, and Yugoslavia.

References

1944 births
Living people
Indonesian footballers
Indonesia international footballers
Sportspeople from Bandung
Persib Bandung players
Association football forwards